The Premier of Mpumalanga is the  head of government of Mpumalanga province in South Africa. The current Premier of Mpumalanga is Refilwe Mtsweni-Tsipane, a member of the African National Congress, who was appointed in March 2018. She took office on 20 March 2018.

Functions
In terms of the constitution, the executive authority of a province is entrusted in the Premier. The Premier designates an Executive Council made up of ten members of the provincial legislature; they are called Members of the Executive Council (MECs). The MECs are accordingly ministers and the Executive Council a cabinet at the provincial level. The Premier has the ability to appoint and dismiss MECs at his/her own discretion.

The Premier and the Executive Council are responsible for implementing provincial legislation, along with any national legislation allotted to the province. They specify provincial policy and administer the departments of the provincial government; their actions are subject to the national constitution.

In order for an act of the provincial legislature to officially become law, the Premier must sign the legislation. The Premier can refer legislation back to the legislature for reconsideration if the Premier believes the act is unconstitutional. If the Premier and the legislature cannot agree, the act must be referred to the Constitutional Court for a final ruling.

The Premier is also ex officio a member of the National Council of Provinces, the upper house of Parliament, as one of the special delegates from the province.

List

Election
The election for the Mpumalanga Provincial Legislature is held every five years, simultaneously with the election of the National Assembly; the last such election occurred on 8 May 2019. At the first meeting of the provincial legislature after an election, the members choose the Premier from amongst themselves. The provincial legislature can force the Premier to resign by a motion of no confidence. If the Premiership becomes vacant (for whatever reason) the provincial legislature must choose a new Premier to serve out the period until the next election. One person cannot have served more than two five-year terms as Premier; however, when a Premier is chosen to fill a vacancy the time until the next election does not count as a term.

See also
 Politics of Mpumalanga
 Premier (South Africa)
 President of South Africa
 Politics of South Africa

References

External links
 Official website

 
Government of Mpumalanga